Kenneth Mossop (15 August 1909 – 18 September 1975) was an Australian cricketer. He played in fourteen first-class matches for Queensland between 1929 and 1933.

See also
 List of Queensland first-class cricketers

References

External links
 

1909 births
1975 deaths
Australian cricketers
Queensland cricketers
Cricketers from Brisbane